Lucia Albano (born 11 February 1965) is an Italian politician. She is a member of the Chamber of Deputies for the Brothers of Italy. She joined Parliament in October 2020.

In November 2022, she was appointed Undersecretary of State for Economy and Finance in the Meloni government.

References

External links

1965 births
Living people
21st-century Italian women politicians
Deputies of Legislature XVIII of Italy
Brothers of Italy politicians
Marche Polytechnic University alumni
Women members of the Chamber of Deputies (Italy)

Women government ministers of Italy